Syria sent a delegation to compete at the 2008 Summer Paralympics in Beijing, China.

Medallists

Sports

Athletics

Men's field

Powerlifting

Men

Women

See also
Syria at the Paralympics
Syria at the 2008 Summer Olympics

External links
International Paralympic Committee

References 

Nations at the 2008 Summer Paralympics
2008
Summer Paralympics